Hamid Reza Ebrahimi (born 16 January 1976) is a retired Iranian football player. During his playing career he played for Aboomoslem, PAS, SAIPA, Saba, Shahid Ghandi Yazd and Bargh.

He was a member of Iran national football team at the 2000 WAFF Championship.

Achievements
Winner: 2000 WAFF Championship with Iran national football team

References

Iranian footballers
Iran international footballers
1976 births
Living people
Sportspeople from Mashhad
F.C. Aboomoslem players
Pas players
Saipa F.C. players
Saba players
Tarbiat Yazd players
Bargh Shiraz players
Association football midfielders